Scelotes capensis, the western dwarf burrowing skink or cape burrowing skink, is a species of lizard which is found in South Africa and Namibia.

References

capensis
Reptiles of South Africa
Reptiles described in 1849
Taxa named by Andrew Smith (zoologist)